SEITA (Société d'exploitation industrielle des tabacs et des allumettes), was the former French state-owned tobacco monopoly. Cigarette brands included Gauloises and Gitanes, both created in 1910. It merged in 1999 with its Spanish equivalent, Tabacalera, to form Altadis.

See also 
 Musée-Galerie de la Seita, a museum of tobacco-related objects

Tobacco companies of France
Defunct manufacturing companies of France
Privatized companies of France
1999 mergers and acquisitions
French companies disestablished in 1999